Forstal is a settlement in Aylesford parish in Kent, England.

Villages in Kent
Tonbridge and Malling